Uravai Thedi is a 2016 Indian Tamil-language reality justice television series. It aired from 8 September 2016 to 2 December 2016 on Puthuyugam TV every Thursday and Friday at 9:00PM IST for 26 episodes. The Show host by Viji Chandrasekhar. The series premiered on the television channel, Puthuyugam TV and was a platform for  reunited with family.

List of episodes

References

External links
 Puthuyugam TV official website 
 Puthuyugam TV on YouTube

Puthuyugam TV television series
2016 Tamil-language television series debuts
Tamil-language talk shows
Tamil-language television shows
2016 Tamil-language television series endings